Ethyl propiolate is an organic compound with the formula HC2CO2C2H5.  It is the ethyl ester of propiolic acid, the simplest acetylenic carboxylic acid.  It is a colorless liquid that is miscible with organic solvents.  The compound is a reagent and building block for the synthesis of other organic compounds, reactions that exploit the electrophilicity of the alkyne group.

References

Alkyne derivatives
Ethyl esters
Carboxylate esters